The Prince Takamado Cup, since 2018, is divided in two age-restricted tournaments, being them the "Prince Takamado Trophy JFA U-18 Football League" and "Prince Takamado Trophy JFA U-15 Japan Football Championship". Both tournaments are annually-contested and run by the Japan Football Association for the under–18 and under-15 sides. The name of the tournament is named after Norihito, Prince Takamado, a long time patron of football in Japan.

Under-18

League structure
From 2003 to 2010, the championship was realized as a short-term tournament, where the Prince Leagues (equivalent to the Japanese Regional Leagues) served as a qualification to it.  Since 2011, the championship is played as a year-round league tournament. 

Currently, in the Prince Takamado U-18 Premier League, 24 teams are split into 2 groups with 12 teams in each, which are called Premier League East, and Premier League West, with each team's geographical positions being the determining factor to decide whether the club should be on the East group, or on the West group. The winners of each group face each other in a one-legged final at a neutral venue to decide the tournament's winners.

On the other side, the 11th and 12th-placed teams of each group are automatically relegated to the Prince League (The tournament's 2nd division), while to keep their stay at the elite, the 10th-placed teams of each group needs to join other 16 teams from the Prince League on a play-off tournament, with the teams being divided by 6 groups with 3 teams in each. The winners of each group are qualified for/remains in the Premier League. 

All the players under the Type 2 registration (Players with the age of 18 or below) are eligible to compete in the leagues

Participating teams (2023 Premier League)

Premier League EAST

Premier League WEST

Participating teams (2022 Prince League)

Hokkaido

Tohoku

Kantō

Division 1

Division 2

Hokushin'etsu

Tokai

Kansai

Division 1

Division 2

Chugoku

Shikoku

Kyushu

Finals

As "Prince Takamado Cup All-Japan Youth (U-18) Football Championship"

As "Prince Takamado Cup U-18 Football League - Premier League"

Under-15
The final of the Under-15 tournament is held in Tokyo National Stadium, before the semifinal of Emperor's Cup.

Participating Teams (2022)
Hokkaidō (10)
Tōhoku (10)
Kantō (10)
Hokuriku & Shin'etsu (12)
Tōkai (10)
Kansai (13)
Chūgoku (10)
Shikoku (12)
Kyūshū (10)

Finals

See also
Prince Takamado Trophy JFA U-18 Football League (ja)
Prince Takamado Trophy JFA U-15 Japan Football Championship (ja)

References

External links
Prince Takamado Trophy JFA U-18 Football Premier League - JFA
Prince Takamado Trophy JFA U-18 Football Prince League - JFA

Football cup competitions in Japan
Youth football in Japan
Recurring sporting events established in 1989